Robert Pringle (died 1736) was a Scottish lawyer and politician.

Life
He was the third son of Sir Robert Pringle, 1st Baronet, of Stitchel, by his wife, Margaret, daughter of Sir John Hope, Lord Craighall, a lord of session; and a younger brother of Sir Walter Pringle of Lochton, Lord Newhall. After studying at the University of Leyden, which he entered 19 November 1687, he took service under William, Prince of Orange, with whom he went over to England at the Glorious Revolution of 1688.

Pringle was in practice as an attorney, and was then appointed under-secretary of state for Scotland in 1695. In this capacity he attended King William in his campaigns abroad.

On 18 May 1718 Pringle was appointed Secretary at War, and he held that office until 24 December. Subsequently he became registrar-general of the shipping.

Pringle died at Rotterdam on 13 September 1736.

Family
Pringle married a Miss Law, and had one son, Robert.

Notes

Attribution

Year of birth missing
1736 deaths
Scottish lawyers
Scottish politicians
Younger sons of baronets